Scopula nigridentata is a moth of the  family Geometridae. It is found in India (the Khasia Hills).

References

Moths described in 1896
nigridentata
Moths of Asia